The official scripts of the 22 official languages of the Indian Republic include abugidas (pseudo-alphabets), alphabetical writing systems and abjads (Arabic-derived writing systems).

Abugida writing systems 

There are ten abugida writing systems, used as the official scripts of India. All these abugidas belong to the Brahmic script family (Indic script family).

Eastern Nagari script 

The Eastern Nagari script or the Bengali–Assamese script is the official script of Assamese language, Bengali language and Meitei language (officially called Manipuri), three of the 22 official languages of the Indian Republic.

The Assamese writing system and Bengali writing system are virtually identical, except for 2 letters, that make Assamese different from Bengali in one letter for the /r/ sound, and an extra letter for the /w/ or /v/ sound. For writing Meitei language, the Bengali /r/ and the Assamese /w/ or /v/ are used, making its writing style unique from those of both Assamese and Bengali languages.

 Assamese
Being the official script for Assamese language, it is officially used in the Northeast Indian state of Assam.
 Bengali
Being the official script for Bengali language, it is officially used in the Indian state of West Bengal, Tripura, Assam (Barak Valley) and Jharkhand.
 Meitei (Manipuri) 
Being one of the 2 official scripts for Meitei language (besides Meitei script), it is officially used in the Northeast Indian state of Manipur.

It is important to note the following:

Devanagari script 

The Devanagari script (romanized: Devanāgarī) is the official script of Bodo, Dogri, Hindi, Konkani, Maithili, Marathi, Nepali, Sanskrit, Santali and Sindhi languages, 10 of the 22 official languages of the Indian Republic.
 Bodo (Boro) 

Being the official script for Bodo language, Devanagari is officially used in the Northeast Indian state of Assam (Bodoland Territorial Region), where Bodo enjoys the additional official language status. 
 Dogri
Being the official script for Dogri language, Devanagari is used in the Indian union territory of Jammu and Kashmir, preceded by the Jammu and Kashmir (state), where Dogri enjoyed the official language status.
 Hindi
The Constitution of India says:

Being the official script for Hindi, Devanagari is officially used in the Union Government of India as well as several Indian states where Hindi is recognised as their official language, Bihar, Chhattisgarh, Haryana, Himachal Pradesh, Jharkhand, Madhya Pradesh, Mizoram, Rajasthan, Uttar Pradesh and Uttarakhand, and the Indian union territories of Delhi, Andaman and Nicobar Islands and Dadra and Nagar Haveli and Daman and Diu. 
Gujarat and West Bengal also officially uses Devanagari as these 2 states recognises Hindi as their additional official languages.
 Konkani
Being the official script for Konkani language, Devanagari is officially used in the coastal Indian state of Goa, where Konkani is the official language.
 Maithili
Being the official script for Maithili language, Devanagari is officially used in the Indian state of Jharkhand, where Maithili enjoys the additional official language status. 
 Marathi
Being the official script for Marathi language, Devanagari is officially used in the Indian states of Maharashtra and Goa, where Marathi is their official language.
The Devanagari script that is used for writing Marathi language is in the Balbodh version.
 Nepali
Being the official script for Nepali language, Devanagari is officially used in the Indian state of Sikkim, where Nepali language enjoys the official language status.
 Sanskrit

Being the official script for Sanskrit language, Devanagari is officially used in the Indian states of Himachal Pradesh and Uttarakhand, where Sanskrit is recognised as their official language.
 Santali
Being the official script for Santali language, besides the Ol Chiki script, Devanagari is officially used in the Indian state of Jharkhand and West Bengal, where Santali language enjoys the official language statuses.

Gujarati script 
Gujarati script is the sole official script used to write Gujarati language, the official language of the Western Indian state of Gujarat and the union territory of Dadra and Nagar Haveli and Daman and Diu.

Gurmukhi script 

The Gurmukhi script is the sole official script of the Punjabi language, the official language of Punjab, Haryana, Delhi and West Bengal inside India.

Kannada script 
The Kannada script is the sole official script for Kannada language, the official language of the South Indian state of Karnataka. Kannada script is highly mutually intelligible with Telugu script, due to which the two are sometimes collectively termed as the Telugu-Kannada script.

Malayalam script 

The Malayalam script is the sole official script for Malayalam, the sole official language of the South Indian state of Kerala and the Indian union territories of Lakshadweep and Puducherry.

Meitei script 

The Meitei script or the Meetei script is one of the 2 official scripts (besides Bengali script) for Meitei language (officially called Manipuri), the sole official language of the Northeast Indian state of Manipur.
Starting from the year 2021, Meitei script was officially used by the Government of Manipur, along with the Bengali script, to write the Meitei language, as per "The Manipur Official Language (Amendment) Act, 2021".

Odia script 

The Odia script or the Oriya script is the official script for Odia language, the official language of the Indian states of Odisha, Jharkhand and West Bengal.

Tamil script 
The Tamil script is the official script for Tamil language, the official language of the South Indian state of Tamil Nadu and the Indian union territory of Puducherry.

Telugu script 
The Telugu script is the official script for Telugu language, the official language of the Indian states of Andhra Pradesh, Telangana and West Bengal as well as the Indian union territory of Puducherry.
Telugu script is highly mutually intelligible with Kannada script, due to which the two are sometimes collectively termed as the Telugu-Kannada script.

Alphabetic writing systems 

There are two alphabetical writing systems used as the official scripts of India. One is indigenous to India and another is introduced to India.

Latin script 
The Latin script (or Roman script) is the sole official script for English language (Indian English), one of the official languages of the Union Government of India as well as many states and union territories of India.

Ol Chiki script 
The Ol Cemet or the Ol Chiki script (romanized: Ol Ciki) is the official script for Santali language, one of the additional official languages of the Indian states of Jharkhand and West Bengal.
It was invented by Pandit Raghunath Murmu in the year 1925.

Abjad writing systems 

The Arabic script or its derivatives like the Persian script or the Urdu script is used as the official scripts by Urdu, Sindhi and Kashmiri, 3 of the 22 official languages of the Indian Republic.
 Urdu
Being the official script for Urdu language, this writing system is used in the Indian states and union territories of Jammu and Kashmir (union territory), National Capital Territory of Delhi, Bihar, Uttar Pradesh, Jharkhand, Andhra Pradesh, Telangana and West Bengal, where Urdu enjoys the official language statuses.
 Kashmiri
Being the official script for Kashmiri language, this writing system is used in the Indian union territory of Jammu and Kashmir, where Kashmiri enjoys the official language status.
 Sindhi
For Sindhi, although Perso-Arabic alphabet in Naskh script is the widely used writing system, Devanagari script is used for governmental purposes as well as enforced for education.

See also 
 Classical Languages of India
 Directorate of Language Planning and Implementation
 Official Languages Commission
 Part XVII of the Constitution of India

Notes

References

External links 

 

 
Writing systems of Asia